Roger Colville Lee (born 1 July 1991) is a Bermudian footballer player who plays for  side Barwell, where he plays as a defender.

Club career
Lee played for local side Somerset Eagles and the Bermuda Hogges in the USL Second Division. He also played for Indianapolis Greyhounds while studying at the University of Indianapolis.

In February 2014, Lee moved to England to play for Ilkeston joining compatriots Antwan Russell, Lejuan Simmons and Rai Simons at the club, but he only played a reserve game for them. He later joined Clevedon Town from Weston-Super-Mare, where he had moved in October 2014.

Lee returned to Ilkeston for training in summer 2015 after his previous spell was marred by injuries and he trained at Weston-Super-Mare and Gloucester City. After playing three matches for Rugby Town in September 2015, he joined Stamford in October 2015.

He joined Estonian Meistriliiga club Tallinna Kalev in December 2018.

On 19 August 2021, Lee signed for Northern Premier League Premier Division side Mickleover. Roger re-signed for Northern Premier League Division One Midlands side Loughborough Dynamo on 22 January 2022.

Lee signed for Southern League Premier Division Central side Barwell on 3 August 2022. He made his debut for the club on 6 August 2022 in a Southern League Premier Division Central fixture at home to Hitchin Town; the match finished 2–1 to the visitors.

International career
He made his debut for Bermuda in an August 2008 CONCACAF Gold Cup qualification match against Antigua and Barbuda and has, as of June 2019, earned a total of 22 caps, scoring no goals. He has represented his country in two FIFA World Cup qualification matches.

Personal life
He was born in Southampton, Bermuda to Roger and Antoinett Lee.

References

External links

1991 births
Living people
People from Southampton Parish, Bermuda
Association football defenders
Bermudian footballers
Bermuda international footballers
Somerset Eagles R.C. players
Bermuda Hogges F.C. players
Robin Hood F.C. players
Ilkeston Town F.C. (1945) players
Weston-super-Mare A.F.C. players
Clevedon Town F.C. players
Rugby Town F.C. players
Stamford A.F.C. players
Basford United F.C. players
Corby Town F.C. players
Stafford Rangers F.C. players
Loughborough Dynamo F.C. players
JK Tallinna Kalev players
Mickleover Sports F.C. players
Barwell F.C. players
USL League Two players
Bermudian expatriate footballers
2019 CONCACAF Gold Cup players
Expatriate footballers in Estonia
Meistriliiga players
Bermudian expatriate sportspeople in Estonia